Confederate Military History is a 12-volume series of books written and/or edited by former Confederate Brigadier General Clement A. Evans that deals with specific topics related to the military personalities, places, battles, and campaigns in various Southern United States states, including those of the Confederacy.

The books were first published in 1899 in Atlanta, Georgia, by Confederate Publishing Company. The original title was Confederate Military History: A Library of Confederate States History, written by distinguished men of the South. Several reprint editions exist, with varying numbers of volumes.

Volumes 
 Volume I - Secession and Civil History of the Confederate States
 Civil History of the Confederate States by Brigadier General Clement Evans
 Volume II - Maryland by Brigadier General Bradley Johnson and West Virginia by Colonel Robert White
 Volume III - Virginia by Major Jedediah Hotchkiss
 Volume IV - North Carolina by Daniel Harvey Hill Jr.
 Volume V - South Carolina by Brigadier General Ellison Capers
 Volume VI - Georgia by Joseph Derry
 Volume VII - Alabama by Lieutenant General Joseph Wheeler and Mississippi by Colonel Charles Hooker
 Volume VIII - Tennessee by Lieutenant Colonel James Porter
 Volume IX - Kentucky by Colonel J Stoddard Johnston and Missouri by Colonel John C. Moore
 Volume X - Louisiana by John Dimitry and Arkansas by Colonel John M. Harrell
 Volume XI - Texas by Colonel Oran Roberts and Florida by Colonel John Dickison
 Volume XII - Military and Post War History
 Confederate States Navy by Captain William Parker

See also 
 Bibliography of the American Civil War

References

External links 

 Volumes 1-12 Online at Hathi Trust Digital Library
 WorldCat Library Search

1899 non-fiction books
History books about the American Civil War
Military history of the Confederate States of America